Alexis Martin (born June 9, 1964 in Montreal, Quebec) is a Canadian actor and writer. A 1986 graduate of the Conservatoire d'art dramatique de Montréal, he has acted in film, television and stage productions, and has written both theatrical plays and film screenplays.

He was a Genie Award nominee for Best Supporting Actor at the 31st Genie Awards in 2010 for Route 132, and for Best Adapted Screenplay at the 20th Genie Awards in 1999 for Matroni et moi. His play Bureaux was shortlisted for the Governor General's Award for French-language drama at the 2004 Governor General's Awards.

Filmography

Film
Cordélia - 1980
The Party (Le Party) - 1990
Cosmos - 1996
Karmina - 1996
The Revenge of the Woman in Black (La vengeance de la femme en noir) - 1997
Nô - 1998
August 32nd on Earth (Un 32 août sur terre) - 1998
Matroni and Me (Matroni et moi) - 1999
Les Boys III - 2001
The Collector (Le Collectionneur) - 2002
CQ2 (Seek You Too) - 2004
Audition (L'Audition) - 2005
Saint Martyrs of the Damned (Saints-Martyrs-des-Damnés) - 2005
A Sunday in Kigali (Un dimanche à Kigali) - 2006
Bluff - 2007
Le Banquet - 2008
Babine - 2008
Route 132 - 2010
Before My Heart Falls (Avant que mon cœur bascule) - 2012
My Internship in Canada (Guibord s'en va-t-en guerre) - 2015
Bad Seeds (Les mauvaises herbes) - 2016
9 (9, le film) - 2016
Hochelaga, Land of Souls (Hochelaga, Terre des âmes) - 2017
We Are Gold (Nous sommes Gold) - 2019
There Are No False Undertakings (Il n'y a pas de faux métier) - 2020

Television
L'Amour avec un Grand A
Radio Enfer
Sous le signe du lion
Fortier
Trauma
Les Parent

Plays
Oreille, tigre et bruit
Matroni et moi
L'An de Grâce
Bureaux
L'Apprentissage des marais
Révolutions

References

External links

1964 births
20th-century Canadian dramatists and playwrights
21st-century Canadian dramatists and playwrights
Canadian male dramatists and playwrights
Canadian dramatists and playwrights in French
Canadian male film actors
Canadian male television actors
Canadian male stage actors
Male actors from Montreal
Writers from Montreal
French Quebecers
Living people
Canadian male screenwriters
20th-century Canadian screenwriters
20th-century Canadian male writers
21st-century Canadian screenwriters
21st-century Canadian male writers
Best Actor Jutra and Iris Award winners